Mariano Deidda (born 1961) is an Italian singer, musician and songwriter.

Musical style and work

He has usually been described by the Italian press as a "singer-poet", for having dedicated most of his records to setting to music the poems and texts of important writers, in particular Fernando Pessoa. Deidda has dedicated several records to this Portuguese poet and, because of this choice, he regularly publishes and performs live in Portugal, as well as in Italy and other countries.

His peculiar and systematic artistic proposal, which combines literature, jazz and his songwriting style, has been presented and/or awarded in the context of important international events, such as, among others, the 1998 Lisbon World Exposition and Le Festival du Poeme Chanté organised by UNESCO in Beirut (Lebanon) in 2006.

During his career, he has collaborated on his records with musicians such as Miroslav Vitous (Weather Report), Camané, Mafalda Arnauth and Celina Pereira, among other international artists.

In addition to records dedicated to Fernando Pessoa (through the Italian translations of Antonio Tabucchi), he has made other records singing the verses and texts of the Italian writer Cesare Pavese and the Italian writer Grazia Deledda, who won the Nobel Prize in Literature in 1926.

Discography
1992 – Quattro canzoni per ricominciare (Marvel)
1998 – L'era dei replicanti (Zelda/Warner/Sony Music)
2001 – Deidda interpreta Pessoa (Lusogram/Sette Ottavi/Warner)
2003 – Deidda interpreta Pessoa – Nel mio spazio interiore (Sette Ottavi/Warner)
2005 – Mariano Deidda interpreta Pessoa – L'incapacità di pensare (Sette Ottavi/Warner)
2007 – Mariano Deidda canta Grazia Deledda – Rosso Rembrandt (Promo Music/Egea)
2011 – Deidda canta Pavese – Un paese ci vuole (Electromantic Music)
2013 – Mariano Deidda canta Pessoa – Mensagem (Zanetti Records/Self)
2016 – Mariano Deidda canta Pessoa – Mensagem – Edizione portoghese (Valentim de Carvalho)
2016 – Pessoa sulla strada del jazz (Valentim de Carvalho)
2020 – Deidda canta Deledda – Edizione portoghese (Valentim de Carvalho)
2020 – Deidda canta Pavese – Special edition (Machiavelli)
2022 – Faust – Fernando Pessoa (Valentim de Carvalho)

References

External links
 Mariano Deidda's official site

1961 births
Living people
Italian male singers
Italian singer-songwriters
People from the Province of South Sardinia